Martijn Hendrik Zuijdweg (born 16 November 1976 in Rotterdam) is a former freestyle swimmer from the Netherlands, who was a member of the Dutch 4×200 m freestyle relay team that won the bronze medal at the 2000 Summer Olympics in Sydney, Australia. He did so alongside Johan Kenkhuis, Marcel Wouda and Pieter van den Hoogenband.

See also 
 Dutch records in swimming

References
 Profile on Zwemkroniek

1976 births
Living people
Olympic swimmers of the Netherlands
Swimmers at the 2000 Summer Olympics
Olympic bronze medalists for the Netherlands
Swimmers from Rotterdam
Olympic bronze medalists in swimming
Dutch male freestyle swimmers
World Aquatics Championships medalists in swimming
Medalists at the FINA World Swimming Championships (25 m)
European Aquatics Championships medalists in swimming
Medalists at the 2000 Summer Olympics